Harley Peyton is an American television producer and writer. He worked in both capacities on Twin Peaks and was nominated for an Emmy Award for his writing on the series.

Biography
He went to Harvard and Stanford.

Peyton began, working on feature films in the 1980s and 1990s. He performed rewrites on several studio productions, and adapted the Dave Robicheaux Heaven's Prisoners novel, by James Lee Burke, into a 1996 feature film. 2009's In the Electric Mist, also featuring Robicheaux (albeit played by Tommy Lee Jones), acted as a sequel but Peyton was not involved.

Peyton also expanded into television in the 1990s, writing and creating series such as Moon Over Miami and Route 66. Other series Peyton has worked on include Dracula, Reign and Dominion. He scripted the superhero series Three Inches for Syfy, but it was never ordered to series. In 2021, he created Reginald the Vampire for Syfy. It has been renewed for a second series.

Filmography

Films

Television

References

External links

American male screenwriters
American television writers
Harvard University alumni
Stanford University alumni
Living people
American male television writers
Year of birth missing (living people)